Okun may refer to:

People
 Arthur Melvin Okun (1928–1980), American economist
 Brackish Okun, fictional character in the 1996 film Independence Day
 Edward Okuń (1872–1945), Polish artist
 Herbert S. Okun (1930–2011), American diplomat
 Lev Okun (1929–2015), Russian physicist
 Milt Okun (1923–2016), American music arranger
 Noam Okun (born 1978), Israeli professional tennis player
 Sid Okun (1912–1986), American activist
 Ronald Okun (born 1923), American pharmacologist

Other
 Okun's law
 Okun people

See also
 
 Russell Okung (born 1988), American football player